Lisolaj is a village in the Bitola Municipality of North Macedonia. It used to be part of the former municipality of Kukurečani.

Geography
Lisolaj belongs to the so-called Pelagonia Region, in the geographical area of Pelagonia and the foot of the mountain Drevenik, 17 km north of the city of Bitola. The village is hilly, at an altitude of 746 meters. Above the settlement is the church of St. Petka which is from the 19th century.

Demographics
Lisolaj is attested in the Ottoman defter of 1467/68 as a village in the vilayet of Manastir. Alongside Christian Slavic names, an individual attested as a priest of the village (prift) bore the typical Albanian anthroponym, Gjergj.

According to the statistics of the Bulgarian ethnographer Vasil Kanchov ("Macedonia, Ethnography and Statistics") from 1900, Lisolaj had 340 inhabitants, all Bulgarians. According to the Bulgarian Exarchate Secretary Dimitar Mišev, ("La Macedoine et sa Population Chrétienne") in 1905 there were 400 Bulgarians in Lisolaj.

According to the 2002 census, the village had a total of 225 inhabitants. Ethnic groups in the village include:

Macedonians 224
Others 1

References

External links
 Visit Macedonia

Villages in Bitola Municipality